Churchill (colloquially known as Hollyhurst) is a hamlet in the north of Devon, England, and is located near the village of East Down, and the town of Barnstaple.

In Media 
The author Nancy Phelan describes her time in the area in The Swift Foot in Time.

Notes

External links

Hamlets in Devon
North Devon